Latrodectus mactans, known as southern black widow or simply black widow, and the shoe-button spider, is a venomous species of spider in the genus Latrodectus. The females are well known for their distinctive black and red coloring and for the fact that they will occasionally eat their mates after reproduction. The species is native to North America. The venom can cause pain and other symptoms, but is rarely fatal to healthy humans.

Taxonomy
Latrodectus mactans was first described by Johan Christian Fabricius in 1775, placing it in the genus Aranea. It was transferred to the genus Latrodectus in 1837 by Charles Walckenaer and is currently placed in the family Theridiidae of the order Araneae. The species is closely related to Latrodectus hesperus (western black widow) and Latrodectus variolus (northern black widow). Members of the three species are often confused with the genus Steatoda, the false widows. Prior to 1970, when the current taxonomic divisions for North American black widows were set forth by Kaston, all three varieties were classified as a single species, L. mactans. As a result, there exist numerous references which claim that "black widow" (without any geographic modifier) applies to L. mactans alone. Common usage of the term "black widow" makes no distinction between the three species.

Description
Legs are long in proportion to body. Females are shiny and black in color, with a red marking in the shape of an hourglass on the ventral (under) side of her very rounded abdomen. There is much variation in female size, particularly in egg-carrying (gravid) females. Many female widows also have an orange or red patch just above the spinnerets on the top of the abdomen. Juveniles have a distinctly different appearance from the adults; the abdomen is grayish to black with white stripes running across it and is spotted with yellow and orange. Males are either purple, or closer to the appearance of the juveniles in color.

The web of the black widow spider is a three-dimensional tangled cobweb of exceptionally strong silk.

Range
The southern widow is primarily found in (and is indigenous to) the southeastern United States, ranging as far north as Ohio and as far west as Texas. The northern black widow (L. variolus) is found primarily in the northeastern United States, though its range overlaps with that of L. mactans. In the Dominican Republic L. mactans is found throughout the whole country. L. mactans is also found throughout Mexico where its range overlaps with that of Latrodectus hesperus and Latrodectus geometricus.

L. mactans, along with L. hesperus and L. geometricus, is established in the Hawaiian Islands (USA). One pathway of entry into Hawaii for at least one of these black widow species is imported produce (which is also considered an important potential pathway for widow spiders elsewhere).

Reproduction
When a male is mature, he spins a sperm web, deposits semen on it, and charges his palpal bulbs with the sperm. Black widow spiders reproduce sexually when the male inserts his palpal bulbs into the female's spermathecal openings. The female deposits her eggs in a globular silken container in which they remain camouflaged and guarded. A female black widow spider can produce four to nine egg sacs in one summer, each containing about 100–400 eggs. Usually, eggs incubate for twenty to thirty days. It is rare for more than a hundred to survive this process. On average, thirty will survive through the first molting due to cannibalism, lack of food, and/or lack of proper shelter. It takes two to four months for black widow spiders to mature enough to breed; however, full maturation typically takes six to nine months. The females can live for up to three years, while a male's lifespan is about three to four months. The female may eat the male after mating.

Prey
Black widow spiders typically prey on a variety of insects, with a preference for fire ants if extant, but they also feed on woodlice, diplopods, and chilopods when they are young, and occasionally other arachnids. The spider's web is even strong enough to catch animals as large as mice. When the prey is entangled by the web, Latrodectus mactans quickly comes out of its retreat, wraps the prey securely in its strong web, then bites and envenoms its prey. The venom takes about ten minutes to take effect; in the meantime, the prey is held tightly by the spider. When movements of the prey cease, digestive enzymes are released into the wound. The black widow spider then carries its prey back to its retreat before feeding.

Natural enemies
There are various parasites and predators of widow spiders in North America, though apparently none of these have ever been evaluated in terms of augmentation programs for improved biocontrol. Parasites of the egg sacs include the flightless scelionid wasp Baeus latrodecti, and members of the chloropid fly genus Pseudogaurax. Predators of the adult spiders include wasps, most notably the blue mud dauber Chalybion californicum, and the spider wasp Tastiotenia festiva. Other species including Mantis or Centipede also will occasionally and opportunistically take widows as prey, but the preceding all exhibit some significant specific preference for Latrodectus.

Furthermore, in 2012, researchers published a paper suggesting that the black widow's close relative, the brown widow, may be competing for territory with, and ultimately displacing black widows in Southern California.

Toxicology

Although the reputation of these spiders is notorious and their venom does affect humans, only mature females are capable of envenomation in humans; their chelicerae—the hollow, needle-like mouthparts that inject venom—are approximately 1 mm, or .04 in. in length, making them long enough to inject venom into humans, unlike those of the much smaller males. The actual amount injected, even by a mature female, is variable. The venom injected by the female black widow is known as alpha-latrotoxin which binds to receptors at the neuromuscular motor end plate of both sympathetic and parasympathetic nerves, resulting in increased synaptic concentration of catecholamines. The symptoms are caused by lymphatic absorption and vascular dissemination of the neurotoxin. The symptoms that result from a black widow spider bite are collectively known as latrodectism. Deaths in healthy adults from Latrodectus bites are exceedingly rare, with no deaths despite two thousand bites yearly, and studies within the past several decades have been unable to confirm any fatalities from this or any of the other U.S. species of Latrodectus (e.g. zero fatalities among 23,409 documented Latrodectus bites from 2000 through 2008). On the other hand, the geographical range of the widow spiders is vast. Epidemics of mostly European widow spider bites had been recorded from 1850 to 1950, and during that period deaths were reported from 2 per 1000 bites to 50 per 1000 bites. Deaths from the western black widow had been reported as 50 per 1000 bites in the 1920s. At that same time, antivenom was introduced. The LD-50 of L. mactans venom has been measured in mice as 1.39 mg/kg, and separately as 1.30 mg/kg (with a confidence interval of 1.20–2.70). In 1933, Allan Blair allowed himself to be bitten by the spider in order to investigate the toxicity of its venom in humans and as a means of convincing skeptics at the time who thought that the spider's venom might not be dangerous to humans.

There are a number of active components in the venom:

 Latrotoxins
 A number of smaller polypeptides—toxins interacting with cation channels, which can affect the functioning of calcium, sodium, or potassium channels.
 Adenosine
 Guanosine
 Inosine
 2,4,6-trihydroxypurine

The venom is neurotoxic.

References

External links

Fact Sheet on the Black Widow Spider includes information on habits, habitat and threats
Latrodectus Mactans on Pterodattilo
University of Washington Burke Museum spider myths
Black Widow Spider Venom and Bites Intoxication Treatment
Information on black widow spider bite in eMedicineHealth
Latrodectus mactans on the UF / IFAS Featured Creatures website.

mactans
Spiders of North America
Fauna of the Caribbean
Arthropods of the Dominican Republic
Fauna of the California chaparral and woodlands
Fauna of the Southeastern United States
Fauna of the Western United States
Spiders described in 1775
Taxa named by Johan Christian Fabricius